Branislav Jakubec (born  in Myjava District) is a Slovak wheelchair curler.

He participated at the 2014 Winter Paralympics where Slovak team finished on sixth place.

Wheelchair curling teams and events

References

External links 

Profile at the 2014 Winter Paralympics site (web archive)

Living people
1967 births
People from Myjava District
Sportspeople from the Trenčín Region
Slovak male curlers
Slovak wheelchair curlers
Paralympic wheelchair curlers of Slovakia
Wheelchair curlers at the 2014 Winter Paralympics